Home is a 2014 song by Naughty Boy from his album Hotel Cabana. It features RØMANS, who is signed to Roc Nation. The song was released as a digital download on 27 July 2014. The song has peaked at number 45 on the UK Singles Chart.

Music video
A music video was created for the song which features life in the eyes of a dog.

Critical reception
4Music said "reassuring and feelgood, this soulful tune ... soothes our blues away".

Track listing

Charts

Release history

References

2014 singles
Naughty Boy songs
2014 songs
Virgin EMI Records singles
Songs written by Romans (musician)
Songs written by Naughty Boy